There have been three events called as the Hague Congress:

 Hague Congress (1872), 5th General Congress of the International Workingmen's Association
 Hague Congress of 1915, also known as the International Congress of Women or Women's Peace Congress (1915)
 Hague Congress (1948), pioneering convention of European federalist movement